Polina Sergeevna Shuvalova (born 12 March 2001) is a Russian chess player. She holds the FIDE titles of International Master (IM, 2020) and Woman Grandmaster (WGM, 2019). She is the 2019 World Girls U-20 Champion as well as the World Girl's U18 Champion in 2018 and 2019.

Together with 43 other Russian chess players, Shuvalova signed an open letter to Russian president Vladimir Putin, protesting against the 2022 Russian invasion of Ukraine and expressing solidarity with the  Ukrainian people.

Biography
Polina Shuvalova was a Moscow chess school student. In 2017, she won the Russian Junior Chess Championship for under-21 girls.

In the 2000s Shuvalova repeatedly represented Russia at the European Youth Chess Championships and World Youth Chess Championships in different age groups, where she won four medals: two gold (in 2013, at the European Youth Chess Championship in the under-12 girls group, and in 2018, at the World Youth Chess Championship in the under-18 girls group), silver (in 2017, at the World Youth Chess Championship in the under-16 girls group) and bronze (in 2016, at the World Youth Chess Championship in the under-16 girls group).

In April 2016, she won the Moscow Women's Chess Championship. In December 2017, in Saint Petersburg Shuvalova made her debut in the Russian Women's Chess Championship Superfinal in which she shared 7st-9st place with Marina Nechaeva. The tournament was won by Aleksandra Goryachkina. In April 2018, She shared 2rd-8th in the European Women's Chess Championship in Vysoke Tatry, Slovakia and earned a spot in the 2020 Women's World Cup. In September 2018, she took 8th place in the Russian Women's Chess Championship Superfinal in Satka.

In October 2019, Shuvalova won the 2019 World Under 18 Girls' Championship in Mumbai, India with a score of 8.5/11. Shortly after, she won the World Girls' Junior Championship in New Delhi with a score of 9.5/11 and was awarded the Woman Grandmaster (WGM) title. 

In 2020, FIDE awarded her the International Master (IM) title. In November, she won the 2020 Russian Women's Team Championship, where she played on the first board for the Moscow Chess Federation team. In December, Shuvalova tied for first place in the Russian Women Superfinal in Moscow with Aleksandra Goryachkina. They played a Rapid tie break which Shuvalova lost and she became the Vice Russia Women Chess Champion.

References

External links
 
 
 

2001 births
Living people
Russian female chess players
Chess International Masters
Chess woman grandmasters